The Raytheon 9 are a group of anti-war activists from the Derry Anti-War Coalition who caused considerable damage to the Raytheon factory in Derry, Northern Ireland. The nine are: Colm Bryce, Gary Donnelly, Kieran Gallagher, Michael Gallagher, Sean Heaton, Jimmy Kelly, Eamonn McCann, Paddy McDaid and Eamonn O'Donnell.

Acting upon information that Raytheon missiles were actively assisting Israel's invasion of Lebanon, and moreover that these missiles were being created at the Raytheon factory in Derry, these nine activists forced entry into the Raytheon offices in Derry on 9 August 2006. They destroyed the computers, documents, and the server of the office, and proceeded to occupy it for eight hours prior to their arrest.
Raytheon itself has not issued a press release on the actions of the Raytheon 9.  When Raytheon staff returned to the offices they claimed that some of their desks had been urinated on and also had human excrement smeared on them.

Local criticism

The city's SDLP Member of Parliament, Mark Durkan, said the protesters were jeopardizing future US corporate investment.

Trial

The activists were charged with criminal damage and affray. The trial of six of the accused began 19 May 2008, in the Laganside Courts in Belfast.  McCann was found guilty of the theft of two computer discs and acquitted of all other charges, and the other five were acquitted of all charges.

References 

2006 Lebanon War
Irish anti-war activists
Anti-war protests
Quantified groups of defendants
Raytheon Company
People from County Londonderry